James Lester Madden (December 13, 1909 – September 15, 1984) was an American figure skater who competed in men's singles and pair skating. His pairs partner was his sister, Grace. He and Grace Madden were the 1934 U.S. national pairs champions.

He was born and died in Boston, Massachusetts.

In singles, he placed seventh at the 1932 Winter Olympics. In pairs, he and Grace Madden placed 11th at the 1936 Winter Olympics.

He graduated from Harvard University and Harvard Business School.

Results
(men's singles)

(pairs with Grace Madden)

References

 
  

1909 births
1984 deaths
American male single skaters
American male pair skaters
Olympic figure skaters of the United States
Figure skaters at the 1932 Winter Olympics
Figure skaters at the 1936 Winter Olympics
Figure skaters from Boston
Harvard Business School alumni
Harvard University alumni
20th-century American people